State Highway 16 (SH 16) is a south–north state highway in the U.S. state of Texas that runs from Zapata on the boundary with Mexico to U.S. Highway 281  south of Wichita Falls. It is the longest state highway in Texas at almost , but is only the ninth-longest of any highway classification in the state.

Route description 

SH 16 begins at an intersection at US 83 in Zapata. The route continues through south Texas ranchlands, then to the north through San Antonio's far south side. The routes enters San Antonio from the southeast, and goes around the west side of the city concurrent with Interstate 410. The route veers to the northwest as it passes through Bandera, Kerrville, and Fredericksburg, and then reaches the Texas Hill Country. After passing through the cities of Comanche and Llano, it continues north through ranchland and farms. Its next intersection is with I-20 south of the town of Strawn. It continues to the northwest, wrapping around the northern and eastern sides of Possum Kingdom Lake. It reaches an intersection with US 380 in the town of Graham. In North Texas, the highway reaches its northern terminus between Antelope and Windthorst, almost 542 miles from its starting point.

Previous routes
SH 16 was one of the original twenty five state highways proposed on June 21, 1917, overlaid on top of the Fort Worth-Oklahoma Highway. From 1917 the routing mostly followed present day Interstate 35W from Fort Worth to Denton.  It continued on, routed along present day Interstate 35 from Fort Worth through to Oklahoma. A spur, SH 16A, went from Denton to Dallas. On March 18, 1919, the route and SH 16A were cancelled, as both routes became part of SH 40.

SH 16 was then reassigned to the future route of U.S. Highway 181 (which was routed over it in 1926) from San Antonio to Corpus Christi on August 21, 1923. SH 16 then went west on SH 44 to Robstown, south on U.S. Highway 77, and west on SH 285. This route replaced portions of SH 9 and SH 12. On January 20, 1930, SH 16 Spur was created in Sinton. SH 16 was extended on January 19, 1932, following SH 9 to Brady, replaced SH 107 to Santa Anna, following SH 7, SH 4, SH 30, and SH 18 to Sagerton, then replaced SH 51 to the Oklahoma State line. On February 10, 1937, the southern section of SH 16 was rerouted northwest and northeast to Fredericksburg, replacing part of SH 81.

On September 26, 1939, the section from Brady to Santa Anna was promptly reassigned to U.S. Highway 183. The section from San Antonio to Corpus Christi, which was cosigned with US 181, was cancelled. The section from Corpus Christi to Robstown was transferred to rerouted SH 44, south of Robstown to rerouted SH 96 (now US 77), and from there to Falfurrias became an extension of SH 285. The section from Sagerton to the Oklahoma State line was renumbered as SH 283. The sections cosigned with other state highways had their co-designation of SH 16 removed. SH 16 was rerouted north to south of Graham, replacing SH 81 and part of SH 120. SH 16 Spur was renumbered Spur 72.

On August 31, 1965, the road was significantly extended via its current routing to Zapata, replacing State Highway 346 from San Antonio to Jourdanton, and also replaced portions of SH 173 and FM 496. On November 16, 1965, it was rerouted over Interstate 410 in San Antonio. On January 31, 1969, SH 16 was extended north to US 281, replacing portions of SH 254 and FM 61.

The section of SH 16 from Loop 1604 to Eckhert Road (former FM 1517) was proposed for decommissioning in 2014 as part of TxDOT's San Antonio turnback proposal, which would have turned back over 129 miles of roads to the city of San Antonio. SH 16 would have been rerouted over Loop 1604, and Spur 421 and Spur 422 would have been extended over old SH 16. However, the city rejected the proposal.

Future
The section of SH 16 between Loop 1604 and Triana Parkway in Helotes is in the process of being upgraded into a superstreet. The main focus of the project includes reconstructing the intersections at Loop 1604 and FM 1560 / Circle A Trail. Construction at the Loop 1604 intersection is projected to be finished sometime in 2019.

Major intersections

References

External links

016
Transportation in Archer County, Texas
Transportation in Young County, Texas
Transportation in Palo Pinto County, Texas
Transportation in Eastland County, Texas
Transportation in Comanche County, Texas
Transportation in Mills County, Texas
Transportation in San Saba County, Texas
Transportation in Llano County, Texas
Transportation in Gillespie County, Texas
Transportation in Kerr County, Texas
Transportation in Bandera County, Texas
Transportation in Medina County, Texas
Transportation in Atascosa County, Texas
Transportation in McMullen County, Texas
Transportation in Bexar County, Texas
Transportation in Duval County, Texas
Transportation in Jim Hogg County, Texas
Transportation in Zapata County, Texas